The New Ohkla Barrage is a weir impounding the Yamuna River, southeast of New Delhi.

The nature of the Yamanu River has changed substantially since the British built the original Okhla barrage in 1874.  The river was known for its fish abundance.  Today the river is fed mostly by the outflow of water treatment plants. The New Okla Barrage has been full to capacity only four times since it was commissioned in 1987.

See also

 Barrages
 Hathni Kund Barrage
 Okhla barrage
 Masani barrage
 Tajewala Barrage

 Wetlands
 Basai Wetland
 Najafgarh drain bird sanctuary
 Sahibi River
 Sultanpur National Park

References 

Dams on the Yamuna River
Tourist attractions in Delhi
Barrages in India
Bridges in Delhi
Bird sanctuaries of Delhi
Lakes of Delhi
Wetlands of India